Peter Røwde Holm (born 5 April 1931) is a Norwegian poet, author and translator. Holm has also worked as an observer at the United Nations' arms control and disarmament conferences. Ever since his writing debut in 1955, he has held an important position in Norwegian poetry. He has also published prose and written articles on foreign policy matters.

Bibliography 
Skygger rundt en virkelighet – poetry (1955)
Din sang om noe annet – poetry (1957)
Men natten kommer senere – poetry (1959)
Innvielse ved havet – poetry (1960)
Stentid – poetry (1962)
Det plutselige landskapet – poetry (1963)
Øyeblikkets forvandlinger – poetry (1965)
Befrielser – poetry (1966)
Diabas – poetry (1968)
Synslinjer – poetry (1970)
Sanndrømt' – poetry (1971)Isglimt, glødepunkt – poetry (1972)Når all min uro stilner – poetry (1973)Reisens formler – poetry (1974)Portrettalbum – poetry (1975)Tegnene tydes – poetry (1976)I disse bilder – poetry (1977)Vinden stiger – poetry (1978)I båten om høsten – poetry (1979)Utvalgte poetry – selected poetry (1981)Den nye kalde krigen. Perspektiver på øst-vest spenningen – nonfiction (1984)Langsom musikk – poetry (1991)Sangen om Aral og andre poetry – poetry (1993)Samlede dikt' – poetry collection (1996)

Prizes 
Sarpsborgprisen 1957
Mads Wiel Nygaards Endowment 1962
Norwegian Critics Prize for Literature 1966, for Befrielser
Riksmål Society Literature Prize 1977
Det Norske Akademis Pris 1996

References

1931 births
Living people
20th-century Norwegian poets
Norwegian male poets
20th-century Norwegian male writers